Otonye Iworima (born 13 April 1976) is a Nigerian long and triple jumper. She attended Queens College Lagos for her secondary education and University of Nsukka for her undergraduate studies where she bagged a second class upper in Applied Art. She also attended International Academy of Sport Science & Technology in Lausanne Switzerland.

In 2006, she finished second at the Commonwealth Games and third at the African Championships. For these achievements the Athletics Federation of Nigeria chose her as the Nigerian Female Athlete of the Year. In 2007, she won another bronze medal, at the All-Africa Games.

Achievements

References

External links
 2006 Commonwealth Games bio

1976 births
Living people
Nigerian female triple jumpers
Athletes (track and field) at the 2006 Commonwealth Games
Athletes (track and field) at the 2010 Commonwealth Games
Commonwealth Games silver medallists for Nigeria
Commonwealth Games medallists in athletics
African Games bronze medalists for Nigeria
African Games medalists in athletics (track and field)
Athletes (track and field) at the 2007 All-Africa Games
Athletes (track and field) at the 2011 All-Africa Games
20th-century Nigerian women
21st-century Nigerian women
Medallists at the 2006 Commonwealth Games